Alexander Jardine may refer to:

Alexander William Jardine (1843–1920), Australian engineer and geographer
Alexander Jardine (British Army officer) (died 1799), Scottish army officer and author
Alexander Jardine (Medal of Honor) (1874–1949), US Navy fireman and Medal of Honor recipient
Alexander Jardine of the Jardine baronets